David Seymour may refer to:

David Seymour (English politician) (died 1557/58), 14th-century Member of Parliament (MP) for Wareham and Great Bedwyn
David Seymour (New Zealand politician) (born 1983), leader of the ACT Party
David Seymour (photographer) (1911–1956), a photographer and photojournalist
David Seymour (rugby union) (born 1984), English rugby union player
David L. Seymour (1803–1867), U.S. Representative from New York
David Thompson Seymour (1831–1916), Irish soldier and police commissioner